The Leinster League is the second tier of rugby in Leinster, behind the Leinster Senior League. It has five divisions. The champions qualify for a round-robin tournament with the champions of the other three provincial junior leagues for one of two promotion places to the All-Ireland League.

Current members (2018–19)

Division 1A
Ashbourne
Boyne
Bective Rangers
Dundalk
Enniscorthy
Gorey
Kilkenny
Wicklow

Division 1B
Coolmine
County Carlow
De La Salle Palmerston
Longford
Monkstown
North Kildare
Tullow
Suttonians

Division 2A
Clondalkin
Cill Dara
Mullingar
New Ross
Newbridge
Portlaoise
Railway Union
Wexford Wanderers

Division 2B
Arklow
Athy
Balbriggan
Birr
Edenderry
Garda
 Midland Warriors
Portarlington

Division 3
Ardee RFC
Athboy
Clane
 Dublin Dogos
 North Meath
Roscrea
 RCSI
Swords

References

External links
Domestic Fixtures & Results

 
2